Pradhyumansinh Mahipatsinh Jadeja is a Member of the Legislative Assembly for Abdasa in the state of Gujarat, India,. He won from Abdasa constituency in 2017 assembly election beating the Bhartiya Janta Party candidate Chabbil Patel by over 10,000 votes. He defected to Bhartiya Janta Party just before 2020 Rajya Sabha parliamentary elections, forcing by election in Abdasa. He was re-elected in 2020 by election. He was a farmer by occupation.

References 

Living people
Indian politicians
Bharatiya Janata Party politicians from Gujarat
People from Gujarat
Politicians from Kutch district
Gujarat MLAs 2017–2022
Gujarat MLAs 2022–2027
Former members of Indian National Congress from Gujarat
1964 births